Panthiades phaleros, the Phaleros hairstreak, is a butterfly in the family Lycaenidae. It is found from Mexico to Brazil.

References

Butterflies described in 1767
Eumaeini
Lycaenidae of South America
Taxa named by Carl Linnaeus